The 2011 New Zealand Derby was a horse race which took place at Ellerslie Racecourse on Saturday 5 March 2011. It was the 136th running of the New Zealand Derby, and it was won by Jimmy Choux.

The lead-up to the race was dominated by Jimmy Choux, with the Hawke's Bay colt seeking to become the first horse in more than 20 years to win both the New Zealand 2000 Guineas and the Derby.

Unlike some years, there was no doubt over who was the best horse in the 2011 New Zealand Derby field. Jimmy Choux had an extraordinary 2010–11 season, winning the Hawke's Bay Guineas, New Zealand 2000 Guineas, Great Northern Guineas, Wellington Stakes and Waikato Guineas to secure hot Derby favouritism. His only defeats were when he was beaten by a nose by Fiddler in the Wanganui Guineas on a very heavy track in his first start of the season, and in the Levin Classic, where he was eased out to finish a long last due to cardiac arrhythmia.

But while there were no arguments over his class, many doubted whether Jimmy Choux could sustain that brilliance and clear superiority over 2400m. His pedigree certainly suggested he would be restricted to races over no more than a mile.

Those doubts were proven unfounded in the most spectacular manner. Jimmy Choux was well back early in the race, then made a sudden and early move on the point of the home turn. He briefly looked vulnerable early in the run home, having already used up his customary turn of foot. Placegetters Historian and On The Level appeared to be rapidly gaining on the favourite. But Jimmy Choux was able to kick again inside the final 100m, drawing away to a comfortable two-length win.

Race details
 Sponsor: Telecom
 Prize money: NZ$2.2 million
 Track: Heavy
 Number of runners: 16
 Winner's time: 2:38.35

Full result

Winner's details
Further details of the winner, Jimmy Choux:

 Foaled: 10 October 2007 in New Zealand
 Sire: Thorn Park; Dam: Cierzo (Centaine)
 Owner: Chouxmaani Investments Ltd
 Trainer: John Bary
 Breeder: Chouxmaani Investments Ltd
 Starts: 16
 Wins: 9
 Seconds: 3
 Thirds: 2
 Earnings: $2,221,550

The road to the Derby
Early-season appearances in 2010-11 prior to running in the Derby.

 Jimmy Choux – 2nd Wanganui Guineas, 1st Hawke's Bay Guineas, 1st New Zealand 2000 Guineas, 15th Levin Classic, 1st Great Northern Guineas, 1st Wellington Stakes, 1st Waikato Guineas
 Historian – 3rd Waikato Guineas, 4th Avondale Guineas
 On The Level – 4th Waikato Guineas, 2nd Avondale Guineas
 Yin Yang Master – 3rd Great Northern Guineas, 2nd Waikato Guineas, 8th Avondale Guineas
 Sierra Nevada – 3rd Avondale Guineas
 O'Reilly's Prize – 5th Avondale Guineas
 Yourein – 3rd Championship Stakes, 6th Karaka Mile, 13th Avondale Guineas
 He's Remarkable – 6th Hawke's Bay Guineas, 2nd New Zealand 2000 Guineas, 3rd Wellington Stakes, 10th Avondale Guineas
 Raffles Knight – 6th-equal Avondale Guineas
 Jetset Lad – 2nd Wellington Stakes, 6th-equal Avondale Guineas
 Hidden Asset – 1st Championship Stakes, 6th Waikato Guineas, 14th Avondale Guineas
 Icepin - 2nd Hawke's Bay Guineas, 3rd Canterbury Stakes, 10th New Zealand 2000 Guineas, 2nd Great Northern Guineas, 2nd Karaka Mile, 1st Avondale Guineas
 Encosta Diablo - 4th Ray Coupland Stakes, 5th New Zealand 2000 Guineas, 5th Karaka Mile, 9th Avondale Guineas

Subsequent Group 1 wins
Subsequent wins at Group 1 level by runners in the 2011 New Zealand Derby.

 Jimmy Choux - Rosehill Guineas, Windsor Park Plate, Spring Classic
 Historian - Thorndon Mile, Zabeel Classic

See also

 2019 New Zealand Derby
 2018 New Zealand Derby
 2017 New Zealand Derby
 2016 New Zealand Derby
 2015 New Zealand Derby
 2014 New Zealand Derby
 2013 New Zealand Derby
 2012 New Zealand Derby
 2010 New Zealand Derby
  Recent winners of major NZ 3 year old races
 Desert Gold Stakes
 Hawke's Bay Guineas
 Karaka Million
 Levin Classic
 New Zealand 1000 Guineas
 New Zealand 2000 Guineas
 New Zealand Oaks

References

External links
 New Zealand Derby replay - YouTube

New Zealand Derby
New Zealand Derby
2011 in New Zealand sport
March 2011 sports events in New Zealand